Veitchia lepidota is a plant species endemic to the Solomon Islands in the Pacific Ocean.

References

lepidota
Flora of the Solomon Islands (archipelago)